María del Pilar Alegría Continente (born 1 November 1977) is a Spanish Socialist Workers' Party (PSOE) politician who has been minister of Education and Vocational Training since 12 July 2021.

Alegría gained a master's degree in primary education and worked with the Department of Education, Culture and Sports in the Government of Aragon. In 2008 she entered national politics when she was elected to the Spanish national parliament as a deputy for Zaragoza province as the second placed candidate on the PSOE list.

References

Spanish Socialist Workers' Party politicians
People from Zaragoza
1977 births
Living people
Members of the 9th Congress of Deputies (Spain)
21st-century Spanish women politicians